Munchhausen in Africa is a 1958 West German musical comedy film directed by Werner Jacobs and starring Peter Alexander, Gunther Philipp and Anita Gutwell. A modern descendant of Baron Munchausen goes to Africa where he has numerous adventures.

The film's sets were designed by the art directors Emil Hasler, Paul Markwitz, and Helmut Nentwig. It was shot at the Spandau Studios in Berlin and on location in Kenya.

Cast
Peter Alexander as Peter von Münchhausen
Gunther Philipp as Bill
Anita Gutwell as Josefine
Johanna König as Karla Mai
Roland Kaiser as Karlchen Mai
Ursula Herking as School director
Erich Fiedler as TV presenter
Hugo Lindinger as Herr Leiser
Franz Muxeneder as Jan
Benno Hoffmann as Wildhüter
Brigitte Mira as Karla Mai (voice)
Bruno W. Pantel as Publisher representative
Arno Paulsen as Tropical doctor
Erna Sellmer as Emilie

References

External links

1958 musical comedy films
German musical comedy films
West German films
Films directed by Werner Jacobs
Films shot in Kenya
Films shot in Tanzania
Baron Munchausen
Films shot at Spandau Studios
UFA GmbH films
1950s German films